Erlend may refer to:

Erlend Apneseth (born 1990), award-winning hardingfele player
Erlend Bjøntegaard (born 1990), Norwegian biathlete
Erlend Bratland (born 1991), Norwegian singer
Erlend Caspersen (born 1982), Norwegian bassist
Erlend Engelsvoll (born 1975), Norwegian former professional racing cyclist
Erlend Erichsen of Gorgoroth, a Norwegian black metal band
Erlend Fuglum (born 1978), Norwegian politician for the Centre Party
Erlend Hanstveit (born 1981), former Norwegian footballer
Erlend Haraldsson, joint Earl of Orkney from 1151 to 1154
Erlend Hjelvik of Kvelertak, a Norwegian heavy metal band from Stavanger
Erlend Holm (born 1983), former Norwegian football defender
Erlend Jentoft (born 1976), Norwegian saxophonist and composer
Leif Erlend Johannessen (born 1980), Norwegian chess player and Norway's fifth grandmaster
Erlend Larsen (born 1965), Norwegian politician
Erlend Lesund (born 1994), Norwegian ice hockey player
Erlend Loe (born 1969), Norwegian novelist, screenwriter and film critic
Erlend Mamelund (born 1984), Norwegian handball player
Erlend Ottem of Clawfinger, a heavy metal band from Sweden
Erlend Øye (born 1975), Norwegian composer, musician, producer, singer and songwriter
Erlend Dahl Reitan (born 1997), Norwegian professional footballer
Erlend Rian (1941–2020), Norwegian politician who formerly represented the Conservative Party
Erlend Segberg (born 1997), Norwegian professional footballer
Erlend Sivertsen (born 1991), Norwegian professional footballer
Erlend Skomsvoll (born 1969), Norwegian jazz musician, band leader, composer and arranger
Erlend Slettevoll (born 1981), Norwegian jazz pianist
Erlend Slokvik, Norwegian ski-orienteering competitor
Erlend Storesund (born 1985), Norwegian footballer
Paul and Erlend Thorfinnsson (Erlend died 1098), brothers who ruled together as Earls of Orkney
Erlend Turf-Einarsson, a Norse jarl ruling the Norðreyjar (the islands of Orkney and Shetland)
Erlend Tvinnereim (born 1981), Norwegian tenor based in Zürich
Erlend Wiborg (born 1984), Norwegian politician for the Progress Party

See also
Elend (disambiguation)
Erlen
Erlendur (disambiguation)

Norwegian masculine given names